Shireland Collegiate Academy is a coeducational secondary school and sixth form in the English academy programme, located in Smethwick, West Midlands, England, built during the early 20th century. Originally called Shireland High School, and later Shireland Language College, the school re-named as Shireland Collegiate Academy in 2007.

The Academy, and its predecessor schools were run by Sir Mark Grundy since 1997 who was knighted for his services to education for his work within the school and its partner Academy, before David Irish took over. Shireland Collegiate Academy were in a partnership with George Salter until September 2011 when George Salter decided to join the Ormiston Academies Trust and Shireland became a stand-alone Academy. The Academy is fully sponsored by Microsoft. The Academy gained 'Teaching School' status in March 2013.

Sir Mark Grundy is now the CEO of Shireland Collegiate Trust, whose headquarters are based at the Academy

The Academy was rated as Outstanding in 2011 and again following a no-notice inspection in 2013.

Inspections
In the most recent inspection  the Academy gained an Outstanding rating overall and in each of the four assessed areas under the new Ofsted framework:

 Achievement of Pupils
 Quality of Teaching
 Behaviour and Safety of Pupils
 Leadership and Management

The report leads with "This is an exceptional academy, which has maintained and built upon the very high standards seen at the last inspection."

In the previous  inspection, the Academy was granted an Outstanding rating by Paul Brooker, Lead Inspector for Academies. The Academy gained outstanding judgments for the following areas:

 Overall Judgement
 Quality of pupils' learning and their progress
 The extent to which students feel safe
 The extent to which pupils contribute to the school and wider community
 Pupils' attendance
 The quality of teaching
 The use of assessment to support learning
 The effectiveness of care, guidance and support
 The effectiveness of leadership and management in embedding ambition and driving improvement
 The effectiveness of the school's engagement with parents and carers
 The effectiveness of partnerships in promoting learning and well-being
 The effectiveness with which the school promotes equality of opportunity and tackles discrimination
 The effectiveness of safeguarding procedures
 The effectiveness with which the school promotes community cohesion
 Overall effectiveness of the Early Years Foundation Stage

The Academy is notable for being the only school to go from 'Special Measures' (the lowest possible rating) to 'Outstanding" (the highest possible rating) in one step.

Examination results
In 2012/13, the Academy posted the following results:
 58% of students at the end of Year 11 obtained 5 or more A*-C GCSE grades including English and Mathematics.
 87% of students at the end of Year 11 obtained 5 or more A*-C GCSE grades not including English and Mathematics.
 At Post-16 97% of students obtained an A-Level pass at E grade or above.
 79% of students made 3 levels of expected progress in Mathematics and 82% in English.

In 2011/12, the Academy posted the following results:

 47% of students at the end of Year 11 obtained 5 or more A*-C GCSE grades including English and Mathematics.
 90% of students at the end of Year 11 obtained 5 or more A*-C GCSE grades not including English and Mathematics.
 At Post-16 92% of students obtained an A-Level pass at E grade or above.

In 2011/12 the overall Academy attendance figure was 94.6%.

Curriculum
The Academy operates an unusual curriculum at Key Stage 3. Students are taught for 17 hours with the same teacher in Year 7, 13 hours in Year 8 and 8 hours in Year 9. These groups are taught under the badge of Literacy for Life (L4L) a competency based curriculum taught in a number of thematic units. This methodology is based on the  Re-inventing Schools Coalition (RISC) work pioneered in Alaska.

There is a heavy focus on the use of technology, with over 600 students having their own personal netbook. The Academy is part of the CDI Apps for Good programme and was named school of the year in 2012.

E-learning and school based company
The Academy has a School Based Company Shireland Learning which provides e-learning support and consultancy. They are responsible for the creation of the Shireland Learning Gateway, a virtual learning environment and management tool based on Microsoft Sharepoint technology. The gateway has been used by as many as 130 schools both within and beyond the United Kingdom. This work was used as the focal point of the opening of the BETT show in 2010 and in the main address by the Schools Minister, Lord Jim Knight.

Composition
The Department of Education School Level Census 2010 lists the composition of the Academy as follows:

Total Pupils on Roll: 1260

Significant Ethnic Populations:

Gender Split:

The Academy also has an onsite nursery.

References

External links

Academies in Sandwell
Smethwick
Secondary schools in Sandwell